Argistes seriatus, is a species of spider of the genus Argistes. It is endemic to Sri Lanka.

See also
 List of Liocranidae species

References

Endemic fauna of Sri Lanka
Liocranidae
Spiders described in 1892
Spiders of Asia